"The Monkey That Became President" is a song written and recorded by the American country music artist Tom T. Hall. It was released in June 1972 as the second and final single from the album, We All Got Together and.... The song peaked at number 11 on the U.S. country singles chart and at number 9 on the Canadian country singles chart.

Content 
The narrator pokes fun at government by showing that a monkey can perform duties better than politicians.

Chart performance

References 
 

Songs about primates
1972 singles
Tom T. Hall songs
Songs written by Tom T. Hall
Song recordings produced by Jerry Kennedy
Mercury Records singles
1972 songs